Jean Devaines (c. 1735, Paris – 15 March 1803) was a French state bureaucrat and journalist. He was a relation of Eusèbe de Salverte and a friend of Julie de Lespinasse.

External links
Académie française

1735 births
1803 deaths
French journalists
Writers from Paris
Conseil d'État (France)
Members of the Académie Française
French male non-fiction writers